Epiplakin is a protein that in humans is encoded by the EPPK1 gene. It belongs to the family of plakin proteins and is found in the human epidermis. It consists of 13 domains which are all similar to the B domain located at the C terminus of the human epidermal and cardiac muscle protein desmoplakin. The domains in epiplakin range from 46 to 70% in their homology to this B domain in desmoplakin. It was first identified as an autoantigen in a person who suffers from a rare autoimmune skin disease. Epiplakin was sequenced to have a total of 5065 amino acid residues and based on its amino acid composition it has a molecular weight of about 552 kDa. The EPPK1 gene is notable for a lack of introns over its coding region - its entire 15 kbp coding region is encoded by a single exon.

Epiplakin has been found to bind to keratin filaments and may contribute to inhibiting the growth of the filaments. This is suspected due to keratin bound epiplakin being found primarily at branch-points and end-points of the keratin filaments. Blocking the expression of epiplakin in cultured corneal epithelial cells via siRNA has been associated with faster wound closure and faster migration of corneal cells. This may be due to the loss of epiplakin leading to a modification of the cytoskeleton in epithelial cells.

References

Further reading 

 
 
 
 
 
 
 
 
 

Plakins